The Stresa-Alpino-Mottarone Cable Car (Italian: Funivia Stresa-Alpino-Mottarone) is an aerial tramway cable transport located in the commune of Stresa in the Piedmont region of Italy. First opened in 1970, the aerial tramway connects Stresa, located on the shores of Lake Maggiore, to the summit of the Mottarone mountain. The Stresa-Alpino-Mottarone Cable Car transported approximately 100,000 passengers per year, prior to the COVID-19 pandemic in Italy. The aerial tramway was a major regional tourist attraction until the Stresa-Mottarone cable car disaster on 23 May 2021.

Route
The Stresa–Alpino–Mottarone Cable Car begins at the Lido di Carciano piazza on the shores of Lake Maggiore in Stresa. The second half of the Stresa–Alpino–Mottarone Cable Car continues from Alpino to a station just below the summit of Mottarone, a mountain peak in the Western Alps. From the Mottarone, passengers can board a short chair lift ride to the mountaintop.

Without stops, the trip from Lido di Carciano at Lake Maggiore to the top of Mottarone takes about twenty minutes and rises 1385 metres.

History
The Stresa-Alpino-Mottarone Cable Car was opened to the public on 1 August 1970, following three years of construction. The aerial tramway replaced the historic  to Mottarone, which operated from 1912 until its closure on 13 May 1963.

The cable car system had undergone a 4.4 million euro renovation and general overhaul between 2014 and 2016. New control panels, engines and passenger cabins were installed at the time. The renovations were funded jointly by the Piedmontese regional government and the town of Stresa. The cable car was closed for construction work in 2014 and reopened on 13 August 2016.

Each of the Stresa–Alpino–Mottarone's stations were also renovated between October 2016 and December 2016.

The number of passengers in each cable car was limited to 40 or less during the COVID-19 pandemic in Italy.

Accidents

Prior to 2021, the Stresa-Alpino-Mottarone Cable Car system had not experienced any serious accidents during its first 50 years of service. There had been three minor incidents when passengers had to be evacuated from the cable cars due to cable entanglements, but there had been no injuries at the time.

References

External links
Stresa–Alpino–Mottarone official site (Italian)

Cable cars in Italy
Transport infrastructure completed in 1970
Transport in Piedmont
Tourist attractions in Piedmont
Stresa